Following are the results of the solo technical routine synchronised swimming competition at the 2009 World Aquatics Championships held in Rome, Italy from July 17 to August 2, 2009.

Results

Green denotes finalists

External links
Preliminary  Results
Final  Results

Synchronised swimming at the 2009 World Aquatics Championships